Ridderronde Maastricht is an elite men's and women's professional road bicycle racing event held annually in Maastricht, Netherlands. The first edition was in 1985 and since 2008 the event also includes a women's race. Since 2019 Ridderronde was renamed RSM Wealer Ronde.

Honours

Men's 

Source

Women's 

Sources

References

External links
 

Women's road bicycle races
Recurring sporting events established in 1985
1985 establishments in the Netherlands
Men's road bicycle races
Cycling in Limburg (Netherlands)
Sports competitions in Maastricht